Richard Mani Ougadja (born 31 January 1988) is a Togolese footballer who plays as a midfielder for ASC Kara and the Togo national team.

International career
Ougadja made his debut with the Togo national team in a friendly 2–0 win over Guinea on 5 June 2021.

Personal life
Mani worked as a teacher of physical education, before concentrating on football. He was 33 at the age of his first international callup. He is the brother of the footballer Mani Sapol.

References

External links
 

1988 births
Living people
Togolese footballers
Togo international footballers
Association football midfielders
21st-century Togolese people